The 1995 City of Lincoln Council election took place on 4 May 1995. This was on the same day as other local elections. One third of the council was up for election: the seats of which were last contested in 1991. The Labour Party retained control of the council.

Overall results

|-
| colspan=2 style="text-align: right; margin-right: 1em" | Total
| style="text-align: right;" | 11
| colspan=5 |
| style="text-align: right;" | 23,277
| style="text-align: right;" | 

All comparisons in vote share are to the corresponding 1991 election.

Ward results

Abbey

Birchwood

Boultham

Bracebridge

Carholme

Castle

Longdales

Minster

Moorland

Park

Tritton

References

1995
1995 English local elections
1990s in Lincolnshire